The 1979 Sun Belt Conference men's basketball tournament was held February 23–25 at the Charlotte Coliseum in Charlotte, North Carolina.

Jacksonville defeated  in the championship game, 68–54, to win their first Sun Belt men's basketball tournament.

The Dolphins, in turn, received a bid for the 1979 NCAA tournament, where they lost to Virginia Tech in the first round. Top-seeded South Alabama, who lost to Jacksonville in the semifinal round, still received an at-large bid, falling to Louisville in the second round.

Format
All six of the conference's members participated in the tournament field. They were seeded based on regular season conference records with the top two teams earning byes to the semifinal round.

All of the games were played at the Charlotte Coliseum in Charlotte, North Carolina.

Bracket

References

Sun Belt Conference men's basketball tournament
Tournament
Sun Belt Conference men's basketball tournament
Sun Belt Conference men's basketball tournament